The Boeing Satellite Development Center is a major business unit of Boeing Defense, Space & Security. It brought together Boeing satellite operations with that of GM Hughes Electronics' Space and Communications division in El Segundo, California.

History 
The facility was originally built by Nash Motors in 1946 and begun production in 1948, building the Nash Rambler. Howard Hughes' Hughes Aircraft Company formed the Aerospace Group within the company when they bought the facility in 1955, when the Nash company became American Motors Corporation and divided the facility into:
 Hughes Space and Communications Group
 Hughes Space Systems Division

In 1953, the Howard Hughes Medical Institute (HHMI) was formed, and Hughes Aircraft reformed as a subsidiary of the foundation. The charity status of the foundation allowed Hughes Aircraft to avoid taxes on its huge income.

In 1961, the two Aerospace Group divisions were reformed as Hughes Space and Communications Company. Hughes Space and Communications Company launched the first geosynchronous communications satellite, Syncom, in 1963.

On 5 April 1976 Howard Hughes died at the age of 70, leaving no will. In 1984, the Delaware Court of Chancery appointed eight trustees of the Howard Hughes Medical Institute, who decided to sell Hughes Aircraft to General Motors for US$5.2 billion—this transaction was completed in 1985. GM merged Hughes Aircraft with its Delco Electronics unit to form Hughes Electronics. This group then consisted of:
 Delco Electronics Corporation
 Hughes Aircraft Company
 Hughes Space and Communications Company
 Hughes Network Systems
 DirecTV

In 1995, Hughes Space and Communications Company became the world's biggest supplier of commercial satellites. In 1997 GM transferred Delco Electronics from Hughes Electronics to its Delphi Automotive Systems and later in the year sold the aerospace and defense operations of Hughes Electronics (Hughes Aircraft) to Raytheon.

Hughes Space and Communications Company remained independent until 2000, when it was purchased by Boeing and became Boeing Satellite Development Center.

In 2005, Boeing Satellite Systems sold Boeing Electron Dynamic Devices to L3 communications.

Current operations 
Hughes added the following to Boeing's portfolio:
 HS-376 – MEASAT, Marcopolo, and others
 HS-601 – ProtoStar II, and others
 HS-702, now the Boeing 702
 U.S. Navy UHF replacement – Military version of HS-601
 NASA Tracking and Data Relay Satellites (TDRS) – Communications with Space Shuttle and International Space Station (ISS)
 NASA Geostationary Operational Environmental Satellites (GOES)
 HSGEO Mobile – Based on the 702 bus, for Thuraya Satellite Communications, United Arab Emirates, and for SkyTerra

The purchase of Hughes Space and Communications Company in 2000 gave Boeing an impressive range of products for design, manufacture, launch and support of satellites. This was in addition to Boeing Integrated Defense Systems' other space assets, e.g. Delta launch vehicles, older-generation GPS satellites, and Rocketdyne and Rockwell's space operations (which include much of the hardware used in NASA's crewed space program, such as the Space Shuttle, International Space Station, rocket engines, etc.)

Currently projects at the Boeing Satellite Development Center (spacecraft being designed, built, tested, or prepared for launch) are satellites made for XM (satellite radio), DirecTV (satellite television), MSV (satellite mobile telephony), Spaceway (data networks), GPS (satellite navigation), and for the Wideband Global SATCOM system (military communications). Designs for ISAT (military orbital radar demonstrator), for additional GOES satellites (meteorology), and for other spacecraft, are currently being developed and proposed.

Subsidiaries 
 Spectrolab – world's leading manufacturer of space solar cells and panels
 Electron Dynamic Devices – sold to L3 communications in 2005
 Millennium Space Systems

See also 

 List of satellites in geosynchronous orbit

References

External links 
 Boeing Satellite Development Center
 Complete list of past satellites and space probes from Boeing Satellite Systems
 Complete list of current navigation and communications satellites projects at Boeing Satellite Systems
 Complete list of satellites built on the 376, 601, and 702 platforms (almost every BSS satellite is an adaptation of one of these three designs)
 Boeing contributions to space exploration projects, past (e.g., X-15, Apollo) and current (e.g., Shuttle, ISS) - includes the work of companies since acquired by Boeing, such as Rockwell International and North American Aviation.

Boeing
Defense companies of the United States
Spacecraft manufacturers
El Segundo, California